The Ivor Novello Awards, named after the entertainer Ivor Novello, are awards for songwriting and composing. They have been presented annually in London by the Ivors Academy (formerly the BASCA) since 1956, and over 1,000 statuettes have been awarded.

Awards
The awards are presented at two annual ceremonies known as The Ivors and The Ivors Composer Awards.

The Ivors take place each May and, as of 2020, are sponsored by Apple Music. They are recognized worldwide as the major platform for recognising and rewarding Britain and Ireland's songwriting and composing talents. The Ivors remain the only award ceremony in the musical calendar that is not influenced by publishers and record companies, but judged and presented by the writing community. 

The Ivors Composer Awards take place each December and are sponsored by PRS for Music. They are broadcast by BBC Radio 3.

The award itself is a solid bronze sculpture of Euterpe, the muse of lyric poetry. It was designed in 1955 by Hazel Underwood.

Award categories

Nominated annual awards
 Best Song Musically and Lyrically
 Best Contemporary Song
 Album Award
 Best Original Film Score
 Best Television Soundtrack
 Best Original Video Game Score

Other annual awards
Songwriter of the Year
Most Performed Work

Other awards
Jazz Award
Classical Music Award
Inspiration Award
Outstanding Song Collection
Outstanding Contribution to British Music
Lifetime Achievement
Special International Award
BASCA Fellowship
Best Dance Single Award 
International Hit of the Year
International Achievement in Musical Theater
Jimmy Kennedy Award
PRS for Music Special International Award
Best Selling UK Single
Best Original Music for a Television/Radio Broadcast
Special Award for Songwriting

Trivia
In 1964, John Lennon and Paul McCartney received four nominations for Ivors, including two nominations in the same category (as writers of both of the two songs competing for Highest British Sales of 1963), and were also given a Special Award for Outstanding Services to British Music. 
Lynsey de Paul became the first woman to receive an Ivor Award for "Won't Somebody Dance With Me" (The Best Ballad or Romantic Song) in 1974 and she went on to win another Ivor a year later for her TV theme song "No Honestly"
In 1976, 10cc musicians Graham Gouldman and Eric Stewart achieved three awards for writing "I'm Not in Love" when it won them the Ivors for Most Performed British Work, for Best Pop Song, and for International Hit of the Year.
In 2008, Amy Winehouse received three nominations for Ivors, including two nominations in the same category (for Best Song Musically & Lyrically).
In 2010, an Ivor was awarded for the first time to a video game soundtrack, the PS3 title, Killzone 2, composed by Joris de Man.

See also
List of Ivor Novello Award winners and nominees (1950s-1960s)
List of Ivor Novello Award winners and nominees (1970s-1980s)
List of Ivor Novello Award winners and nominees (1990s-2000s)
List of Ivor Novello Award winners and nominees (2010s-2020s)

References

External links

 
Awards established in 1955
1955 establishments in the United Kingdom